Events from the year 1966 in Scotland.

Incumbents 

 Secretary of State for Scotland and Keeper of the Great Seal – Willie Ross

Law officers 
 Lord Advocate – Gordon Stott
 Solicitor General for Scotland – Henry Wilson

Judiciary 
 Lord President of the Court of Session and Lord Justice General – Lord Clyde
 Lord Justice Clerk – Lord Grant
 Chairman of the Scottish Land Court – Lord Birsay

Events 
 1 February – Heriot-Watt College in Edinburgh is designated Heriot-Watt University.
 9 February – construction of a prototype fast breeder nuclear reactor at Dounreay on the north coast of Scotland is announced.
 28 March – Ballachulish branch railway officially closed; Connel Bridge becomes a road-only crossing.
 11 April (Easter Monday) – Scottish clearing banks observe today as a bank holiday for the first time, aligning them with those in England.
 May
 Pioneering west coast roll-on/roll-off ferry Isle of Gigha enters service.
 Royal Commission on Local Government in Scotland (chaired by Lord Wheatley) appointed.
 27 June
 Glasgow Airport officially opened by Queen Elizabeth II.
 Glasgow St Enoch railway station officially closed.
 18 July – Old Man of Hoy first climbed, by Chris Bonington, Rusty Baillie and Tom Patey.
 18 August – the Tay Road Bridge opens linking Dundee with Fife.
 29 August – Scottish clearing banks observe this last Monday in August (rather than the first) as a bank holiday for the first time.
 28 October – first Red Road Flats in Glasgow officially opened.
 9 November – Irvine is designated as a New Town.
 11 November – MV Isle of Gigha capsizes on a Gigha–Port Ellen crossing.
 Scottish Grand National first run at Ayr Racecourse.

Births 
 March – Jamie Oag, entrepreneur
 18 March – Joanna Cherry, Scottish National Party politician and lawyer
 28 May – Roddy Lumsden, poet (died 2020)
 7 August – David Cairns, Scottish Labour politician, Parliamentary Under-Secretary of State for Scotland and MP for Inverclyde (died 2011)
 20 September – Douglas Gordon, visual artist
 12 October – Rhona Martin, curler
 26 October – Steve Valentine, actor
 8 November – Gordon Ramsay, celebrity chef
 23 November – Kevin Gallacher, international footballer
 Laura Hird, fiction writer

Deaths 
 1 January – Alexander Carrick, sculptor (born 1882)
 7 January – Allan Chapman, lawyer and politician (born 1897)
 16 July  – Agnes Dollan, suffragette, political activist and leader of the Glasgow Rent Strikes (born 1887)
 6 November – Hugh Fraser, 1st Baron Fraser of Allander, retailer (born 1903)
 24 December – Sir Donald MacGillivray, last colonial governor of Malaya (born 1906)

The arts
 7 January – school-based television drama series This Man Craig is first screened by BBC Scotland with John Cairney in the title rôle.
 The Bay City Rollers and The Incredible String Band form in Edinburgh.

See also 
 1966 in Northern Ireland

References 

 
Scotland
Years of the 20th century in Scotland
1960s in Scotland